Events from the year 1986 in art.

Events
21 May – Eighteen Old Master paintings from the Beit collection are stolen from Russborough House in Ireland by Martin "The General" Cahill, the second major art theft from this location.
19 August – Two weeks after it was stolen, the Picasso painting Weeping Woman is found in a locker at Spencer Street station in Melbourne, Australia.
Opening of the Musée d'Orsay (formerly the Gare d'Orsay) in Paris.

Awards
Archibald Prize – Davida Allen, Dr John Arthur McKelvey Shera
Sulman Prize – Wendy Sharpe, Black Sun – Morning and Night
Turner Prize – Gilbert and George
Shortlisted: Art & Language, Victor Burgin, Derek Jarman, Stephen McKenna and Bill Woodrow

Exhibitions
23 November – The Spiritual in Art: Abstract Painting 1890–1985 opens at Los Angeles County Museum of Art. Organized by Maurice Tuchman, this is the first public showing of the abstract art of Swedish painter and mystic Hilma af Klint (died 1944).

Works

David Adickes – Cornet (sculpture, Galveston, Texas)
Yaacov Agam - Fire and Water Fountain at Dizengoff Square in Tel Aviv, Israel (Dedicated)
Ruth Asawa – Aurora (sculpture, San Francisco)
John Buckley – The Headington Shark (Untitled 1986; painted fibreglass sculpture)
Daniel Buren - Les Deux Plateaux  in the inner courtyard (Cour d'Honneur) of the Palais Royal in Paris, France
John Burgee and Philip Johnson – Clarke Memorial Fountain (Notre Dame, Indiana)
Wayne Chabre – Einstein Gargoyle (sculpture, Eugene, Oregon)
John Doubleday – Royal Marines Commando Memorial (Lympstone, England)
Georgia Gerber – Animals in Pools (sculptures, Portland, Oregon)
Robert Graham - Monument to Joe Louis installed at Hart Plaza in Detroit, Michigan, United  States
David Hockney – Pearblossom Highway #2 (photocollage)
Ellsworth Kelly – Houston Triptych (bronze sculpture, Houston, Texas)
Igor Mitoraj – 
Odd Nerdrum – Return of the Sun
Kantilal B. Patel – Mohandas Gandhi (sculpture, New York City)
Andy Warhol
Camouflage
Map of Eastern U.S.S.R. Missile Bases
The Last Supper (Series completed )
Andrew Wyeth – Flood Plain
Jamie Wyeth – Kalounna in Frogtown (Terra Foundation for American Art)
Yu Tang Wang and Sun Chau – Chinatown Gateway (structure, Portland, Oregon)

Births
15 April – Amy Louise Nettleton, British installation and sculpture artist.
Oscar Murillo, Colombian-born artist.

Deaths

January to June
6 March – Georgia O'Keeffe American artist (b. 1887).
26 April – Dechko Uzunov, Bulgarian painter (b. 1899).
11 May – Henry Plumer McIlhenny, American art collector, philanthropist and chairman of Philadelphia Museum of Art (b. 1910).
31 May – Jane Frank, American painter, sculptor, mixed media artist and textile artist (b. 1918).
9 June – Ilona Harima, Finnish painter (b. 1911).

July to December
7 April – Cecil King, Irish abstract-minimalist painter (b. 1921).
30 June – Guan Zilan, Chinese avant-garde painter (b. 1903)
22 July – Floyd Gottfredson, American cartoonist (b. 1905).
31 August – Henry Moore, English artist and sculptor (b. 1898).
9 September – Albert Malet, French painter (b. 1912).
12 September
Ernst Haas, Austrian photographer (b. 1921).
Jacques Henri Lartigue, French photographer and painter (b. 1894).
18 September – Corita Kent, American nun and silkscreen printer (b. 1918).
11 October – Barker Fairley, English-born Canadian painter, writer, and educator (b. 1887).
23 October – Conrad O'Brien-ffrench, British intelligence officer, mountaineer and painter (b.1893).

Undated
Marko Čelebonović, Serbian painter (b. 1902).
Guan Liang, Chinese artist (b. 1900).

See also 
 1986 in fine arts of the Soviet Union

References

 
 
1980s in art
Years of the 20th century in art